Kolačno is a village and municipality in Partizánske District in the Trenčín Region of western Slovakia.

History
In historical records the village was first mentioned in 1293.

Geography
The municipality lies at an altitude of 240 metres and covers an area of 21.314 km2. It has a population of about 887 people.

Genealogical resources

The records for genealogical research are available at the state archive "Statny Archiv in Nitra, Slovakia"

 Roman Catholic church records (births/marriages/deaths): 1706-1901 (parish B)

See also
 List of municipalities and towns in Slovakia

References

External links

  Official page
https://web.archive.org/web/20071006173841/http://www.statistics.sk/mosmis/eng/run.html
Surnames of living people in Kolacno

Villages and municipalities in Partizánske District